The Minnesota Golden Gophers women's soccer team represent the University of Minnesota in the Big Ten Conference of NCAA Division I soccer. The current head coach is Erin Chastain who is in her first year as the Gopher head coach.

Record by year

Totals updated through the end of the 2017–2018 school year.

References

External links

 
Soccer clubs in Minnesota
NCAA Division I women's soccer teams